The Brumbaugh Bridge was a covered bridge in Lane County in the U.S. state of Oregon. Built in 1948, the structure originally carried Row River Road over Mosby Creek near Cottage Grove. It was added to the National Register of Historic Places in 1979 and was subsequently delisted.

The bridge was demolished in 1979. Some of its timbers were combined with timbers from Meadows Bridge, also demolished in 1979, to construct a covered pedestrian bridge, Centennial Covered Bridge, over the Coast Fork Willamette River in Cottage Grove.

The first Brumbaugh Bridge was a  Howe truss structure built in 1925.

See also
 List of bridges on the National Register of Historic Places in Oregon
 List of Oregon covered bridges

References

Bridges completed in 1948
Covered bridges in Lane County, Oregon
Covered bridges on the National Register of Historic Places in Oregon
Wooden bridges in Oregon
National Register of Historic Places in Lane County, Oregon
Road bridges on the National Register of Historic Places in Oregon
Howe truss bridges in the United States
Former National Register of Historic Places in Oregon